KTYN (91.9 FM) was a radio station broadcasting a nostalgia music format. Licensed to Thayne, Wyoming, United States, the station was owned by Intermountain Public Radio and featured programming from Premiere Radio Networks.

The Federal Communications Commission cancelled KTYN's license on October 4, 2021, due to the station failing to file an application to renew its license.

Translators

References

External links

TYN
Lincoln County, Wyoming
Radio stations established in 2007
Radio stations disestablished in 2021
2007 establishments in Wyoming
2021 disestablishments in Wyoming
Defunct radio stations in the United States
TYN